Dudi Sela was the defending champion. He didn't compete this year.
Marcos Baghdatis defeated Xavier Malisse 6–4, 6–4 in the final.

Seeds

Draw

Finals

Top half

Bottom half

References
 Main Draw
 Qualifying Draw

Odlum Brown Vancouver Open
Vancouver Open